The PBK-500U Drel is an inertial and GLONASS-guided cluster glide bomb developed by the Russian Federation, designed to destroy enemy armored vehicles and buildings. Drel is equipped with friend or foe identification system and electronic countermeasures making it resistant to jamming and radar detection and is planned to be introduced to the Russian military in 2018. Bazalt considers equipping Drel with a pulsejet engine to increase its range.

Parameters
 Altitude: 14 km
 Range:  30–50 km
 Weight: 540 kg

Munitions
 15 self-targeting anti-tank SPBE-K submunitions with a twin-band (3–5 µm and 8–14 µm) infrared seeker and a millimetre-wavelength radar seeker with an identification of friend-or-foe (IFF) system
 Other types of munitions are under development

Operators

See also
 Avangard (hypersonic glide vehicle)
 Convention on Cluster Munitions

References

Weapons of Russia
Aerial bombs of Russia
Anti-tank weapons
 
Guided bombs
Cluster munition
Area denial weapons
Military equipment introduced in the 2010s